James Douglas, 14th Earl of Morton, KT, FRS (1702 – 12 October 1768) was a Scottish astronomer and representative peer who was president of the Philosophical Society of Edinburgh from its foundation in 1737 until his death. He also became president of the Royal Society (24 March 1764), and was a distinguished patron of science, and particularly of astronomy.

He was born in Edinburgh as the son of George Douglas, 13th Earl of Morton and his second wife Frances Adderley.  He graduated MA from King's College, Cambridge, in 1722. In 1746 he visited France, and was imprisoned in the Bastille, probably as a Jacobite.
He had a long lasting tendency to protest the actions of the British government.

Family
He was twice married: firstly to Agatha, daughter of James Halyburton of Pitcur, Forfarshire, by whom he was the father of three sons, two of whom died young, and three daughters.  The second son, Sholto Douglas, 15th Earl of Morton, succeeded him. Secondly, on 31 July 1755, at St James's Church, Piccadilly, he married Bridget, daughter of Sir John Heathcote, Bt., of Normanton, who bore him a son, John (b. 4 July 1756), and a daughter, Bridget (b. 3 May 1758).  His wife, Bridget, outlived him by thirty-seven years.

Legacy
Moreton Bay in Queensland, Australia, was named after Lord Morton by Lieutenant James Cook (the spelling being an error in the published account of Cook's voyage in ). Lord Morton had been influential in obtaining a grant of £4,000 to finance the voyage. Cook had been instructed by the earl to regard the native populations of the places he might visit as "human creatures, the work of the same omnipotent Author, equally under his care with the most polished European ... No European nation has the right to occupy any part of their country ... without their voluntary consent“.

In popular media 
Actor Brian Cox was cast as Lord Morton in the TV series, Longitude in 2000.

See also
 List of presidents of the Royal Society

References

1702 births
1768 deaths
Earls of Morton
Knights of the Thistle
Presidents of the Royal Society
Scottish representative peers
Alumni of King's College, Cambridge
Members of the Philosophical Society of Edinburgh
Members of the French Academy of Sciences
Scottish astronomers
Scottish Jacobites
Grand Masters of the Premier Grand Lodge of England
Freemasons of the Premier Grand Lodge of England
Prisoners of the Bastille